Thiey Mihithuge Vindhakee is a 2003 Maldivian romantic television series directed by Abdul Faththaah. The series stars Sheela Najeeb, Mohamed Manik, Zeenath Abbas in lead roles.

Premise
Ahmed Ayaz (Mohamed Manik) visits his parents' island and meets Aminath Nadhiya (Sheela Najeeb) whom he falls deeply in love with, although his mother, Zainab (Haajara Abdul Kareem) finalizes his marriage with another girl. Zainab disapproves their relationship and desperately tries to separate the couple. Ayaz leaves to Male' with his family, promising to return in a few days to bring back Nadhiya, however is met with an accident and dies, on the day he was supposed to depart.

Mohamed Adheel (Mohamed Manik), a lookalike of Ayaz is introduced, who is married to an infertile nurse, Husna (Zeenath Abbas) and desperately trying to conceive a baby. Husna is continuously blackmailed by her ex-husband, Shareef (Ahmed Saeed) who warns her to expose her infertility to Adheel, if she fails to fulfill his demands. Adheel unknowingly visits to Nadhiya's island, accompanied by his friend, Amir (Hassan Afeef). He meets Nadhiya who compares him with Ayaz, someone whom Adheel has never met. Nadhiya agrees to marry Adheel unbeknownst to her of his previous marriage.

Cast

Main role
 Mohamed Manik as Ahmed Ayaz / Mohamed Adheel
 Sheela Najeeb as Aminath Nadhiya
 Zeenath Abbas as Husna
 Hassan Afeef as Amir
 Ahmed Saeed as Shareef
 Mariyam Shakeela as Zubeidha
 Aminath Rasheedha as Zuhura, Adheel's mother
 Aminath Suneetha as Mariyam
 Niuma Mohamed as Farahanaz

Recurring role
 Zuleikha Abdul Latheef as Azeeza
 Mohamed Faisal as Moosa
 Sheereen Abdul Wahid as Shimla
 Arifa Ibrahim as Zareena
 Ali Ahmed as Hussain
 Neena Saleem as Inaya; Amir's wife
 Mariyam Haleem as Dhaleyka; Nadhiya's grandmother
 Chilhiya Moosa Manik as Saeed; Ayaz's father
 Ali Shameel as Abdul Samad Hussain
 Ibrahim Wisan as Dr. Nadheem
 Haajara Abdul Kareem as Zainab; Ayaz's mother
 Fathimath Shiuna as Zeyna Qasim
 Hussain Sobah as Dr. Muneer
 Mohamed Afrah as Fauzy

Guest role
 Waleedha Waleed as Adheel's sister
 Khadheeja Ibrahim Didi as Mizna
 Ismail Hilmy as Moosa
 Ravee Farooq as Shaukath; Amir's colleague
 Abdulla Munaz as a Doctor
 Husnee as Falah
 Ibrahim Rasheed as a magistrate
 Nasih as Haneef
 Ahmed Ziya as Afzal
 Mariyam Zuhura as a doctor

Development and release
The story was based on the novel published by Ibrahim Waheed of the name Hithu Vindhu on Haveeru Daily. Few episodes before the series finale, Waheed was replaced by Aishath Neena.

The series was released in 2003. It was later streamed on digital platform Baiskoaf from 5 July 2020. The series mainly received positive reviews from critics and viewers. Ahmed Adhushan from Mihaaru choose the series among the "Top 5 best series directed by Faththaah". Sajid Abdulla reviewing from MuniAvas selected the series in the "Top 10 best television series of all time" and wrote: "The series will remain one of the best production in television industry. The scenes where Sheela desperately waits for a call from Manik and running on the beach bidding farewell to him are still iconic".

Soundtrack

References

Serial drama television series
Maldivian television shows